The ballan wrasse (Labrus bergylta) is a species of marine ray finned fish from the family Labridae, the wrasses. It is found in the eastern Atlantic Ocean, where it inhabits rocky areas. Like many wrasse species, it is a protogynous hermaphrodite—all fish start life as females, and some dominant fish later become males. It is used as a food fish in some areas and it is also finding use as a cleaner fish in the aquaculture of Atlantic salmon (Salmo salar) in northwestern Europe.

Description
The ballan wrasse is a large, heavy bodied wrasse with a relatively deep body and large head. It has a smallish mouth which is surrounded by thick, fleshy, rather wrinkled lips, and the jaws are armed with a single row of robust teeth which are sharp and pointed in young fish but blunter and more worn in older fish. It has a long dorsal fin which has 18–21 spines in its anterior portion and 9–13 branched rays in the rear part. The anal fin is markedly shorter and has three spines. It has large scales with 41–47 of them in the lateral line. The juvenile fish are coloured to match their habitat and vary in from light green to dark green, with some being described as bright emerald green. The adults are more variable in colour, as they can either be dark green or reddish brown but are marked all over with numerous white spots. Ballan wrasses are prototgynous hermaphrodites.

Distribution
Ballan wrasse are native to the northeastern Atlantic Ocean from Norway to Morocco, including the islands of Madeira, the Azores and the Canary Islands. There are records from the Mediterranean Sea but these are regarded as questionable and may be misidentifications of the brown wrasse (Labrus merula).

Habitat and biology
They can be found at depths from  amongst rocks, seaweed and reefs. All ballan wrasses are female for their first four to 14 years before a few change into males. Large fish of the species are almost certainly male. The thick lips and sharp front teeth of the ballan wrasse are an adaptation for extracting shellfish from rocks. These are supplemented by powerful pharyngeal teeth which are placed further back in the throat and which can break up shells to access flesh inside. This species also feeds on crustaceans and their diet includes hard-shelled crabs and small lobsters. They will swim into shallower water so that they can prey on the shellfish which cling to underwater cliff faces and inshore rocks. They will also inhabit areas with good covering of kelp and other seaweeds. The male builds a nest of algae in a crevice in the rocks in which one or more females lay eggs. The male defends the nest until the eggs hatch into pelagic larvae after a week or two.

Ballan wrasse do not have stomachs.

Human usage

Fishery and Sport 
This species is popular as a food fish in the Orkney Islands off the north-eastern coast of Scotland, and in Galway, a county in the west of Ireland. However, it is not highly regarded as a food fish in much of the UK and Ireland. In recent years, it has become a popular catch-and-release target for sport fishermen using light fishing tackle, particularly those employing soft plastic lures.

Aquaculture 
This fish is one of 5 key species used as cleaner fish to remove sea lice from Norwegian and Scottish farmed salmon, with 3,317,000 fish used in Atlantic salmon and rainbow trout sea pens in 2020 in Norway alone.  Along with lumpfish, this species is farmed for this purpose. 

As with many farmed marine species, commercial larval rearing utilises live prey before transitioning to dry feeds after metamorphosis is complete. The majority of the industry currently uses enriched rotifers and Artemia, but copepod nauplii (Acartia tonsa) and barnacle nauplii (Semibalanus balanoides) are becoming more common as alternatives. 

This species can also be found in the aquarium trade.

References

External links
 

Ballan wrasse
Fish of the Atlantic Ocean
Fish described in 1767
Taxa named by Peter Ascanius